"Live Your Life" is a song by Bomfunk MC's and Max'C. The single was released in 2002 and reached the top ten in the United Kingdom, United States, Germany and Japan. The song has been listed for four weeks on the German Singles Top 100. It entered the chart on position 67 in 2003 and peaked on number 67, where it stayed for one week. The single was accompanied by multiple remixes.

Charts

Track listing

References

2002 songs
2002 singles
Bomfunk MC's songs
Number-one singles in Finland